Edward J. Giorgianni is an Imaging Scientist formerly of the Imaging Research and Advanced Development Division at Eastman Kodak Company.

Giorgianni is best known for his contributions in the field of color science and hold numerous patents in the fields of color management and imaging technology.  Among his inventions are the digital color-encoding methods used on many commercial imaging systems, including the Photo CD System.  Giorgianni is a co-author of Digital Color Management Encoding Solutions, which he wrote with Thomas E. Madden. The text contains a foreword by another noted color scientist and author of The Reproduction of Colour, R. W. G. Hunt. In addition, Giorgianni is an instructor and frequent lecturer at technical symposia and universities.

Giorgianni retired from the Eastman Kodak Company in 2005, although he continues to consult and lecture.

References

American people of Italian descent
Year of birth missing (living people)
Living people
Place of birth missing (living people)